Nor Yedesia is a village in the Ashtarak Municipality of the Aragatsotn Province of Armenia. Nor Yedesia was a former sovkhoz (collective farm) founded in 1975.

References 

Report of the results of the 2001 Armenian Census

Populated places in Aragatsotn Province

Populated places established in 1975
Cities and towns built in the Soviet Union